Estelle Perrossier (born 12 January 1990) is a French sprinter specialising in the 400 metres. She competed in the 4 × 400 metres relay event at the 2015 World Championships in Athletics in Beijing. Her personal bests in the event are 52.25 seconds outdoors (Saint-Étienne 2015) and 53.67 seconds indoors (Ghent 2016).

International competitions

References

External links
 

1990 births
Living people
French female sprinters
World Athletics Championships athletes for France
Athletes from Lyon